Kijabijo is a neighborhood in Kira Town, in Wakiso District in the Buganda Region of Uganda.

Location

The coordinates of Kijabijo are 0°28'34.0"N, 32°40'01.0"E (Latitude:0.476111; Longitude:32.666944).

Overview
Kijabijo, was a village prior to 2001, when it was incorporated into Kira Town. The Gayaza–Kayunga Road passes through the neighborhood in a general west–to–east direction, dividing Kijabijo into North Kijabijo and South Kijabijo.

The horse farm, with about 40 animals, as of January 2016, rears horses, keeps horses for other owners, provides space for hire and offers horse riding lessons.

The Lwajjali River, which forms the border between Mukono District to  the east and Wakiso District to the west, forms the eastern border of Kijabijo, and separates the neighborhood from the town of Nakasajja, in Mukono District.

See also
List of cities and towns in Uganda

References

External links
Ministry Of Lands Official Arrested for Issuing Land Titles in Wetlands As of 23 June 2017.

Populated places in Central Region, Uganda
Kira Town